Kid 'n Play is an American hip-hop duo from New York City that was most popular in the late 1980s and early 1990s. The duo was composed of Christopher Reid ("Kid") and Christopher Martin ("Play") working alongside their DJ, Mark "DJ Wiz" Eastmond. Besides their musical careers, they are also notable for branching out into acting.

History

Music career 
The pair met while performing in rival high school groups the Turnout Brothers and the Super Lovers, and initially formed their duo under the name the Fresh Force Crew. In 1986 She's a Skeezer and Rock Me were recorded. By 1987 they had changed their name to Kid 'n Play.

Kid 'n Play recorded three albums together between 1988 and 1991: 2 Hype (1988), Kid 'n Play's Funhouse (1990), and Face the Nation (1991). Hurby "Luv Bug" Azor, the producer for Salt-N-Pepa (who had been a member of the Super Lovers with Play) served as Kid 'n Play's manager and producer during the early portion of their career. All three albums focused upon positive lyrics backed by pop-friendly instrumental tracks. Among the group's most successful singles were 1989's "Rollin' with Kid 'n Play" (No. 11 on the Billboard R&B singles chart), 1990s "Funhouse" (No. 1 on the Billboard rap singles chart), and "Ain't Gonna Hurt Nobody" (another No. 1 rap hit). The group's stage show highlighted their teen-friendly personalities, and dances such as their trademark, the Kick Step. Kid's visual trademark was his hi-top fade haircut, which stood ten inches high at its peak. Martin regularly wore eight-ball jackets.

Kid 'n Play were also notable for their dance known as the Kid n' Play Kickstep, first seen in their video "Do This My Way," and described in the song "Do the Kid n' Play Kickstep," from their first album, 2 Hype. Also affectionately known as the "Funky Charleston," it was influenced by the 1920s era dance The Charleston. The Kid n' Play Kickstep featured the new jack swing-aerobic dance moves typical of late 1980s urban street dancing. Unlike the original Charleston, the Kid n' Play Kickstep requires two participants instead of one. This dance also was made quite popular in Kid 'n Play's feature film House Party, in which Kid and Play have a dance competition with Tisha Campbell and Adrienne-Joi Johnson.

Acting careers 
In addition to their music, Kid 'N Play have starred together in five feature films, all of them based around hip hop characters and themes. The duo also appeared on the soundtrack albums to these films. Four of the Kid 'n Play films were entries in the House Party series.  The first two House Party films (1990's House Party and 1991's House Party 2) also featured the then-relatively unknown Martin Lawrence and Tisha Campbell, later stars of the TV sitcom Martin. House Party 3 (1994) featured hip-hop/R&B girl group TLC as the music group Sex as a Weapon. Kid 'n Play were absent from the fourth film House Party 4 (2001), which has no connection to any of the prior films or the subsequent film, House Party 5 (2013) in which the duo make a cameo appearance, revealing how successful their characters have become since the events of House Party 3.  House Party was originally meant for DJ Jazzy Jeff & the Fresh Prince. Years later in an interview with Halftimeonline.net DJ Jazzy Jeff revealed: 

Class Act, produced in 1992, was a comedy in the same vein as the House Party films. For that film, Reid traded his trademark hi-top fade in for braids instead. The haircut is used as a plot device in the film.

Kid 'n Play even had their own NBC Saturday morning cartoon, Kid 'n Play, for one season from 1990 to 1991. On the show, Kid 'n Play were regressed to teenagers, but their recording careers remained intact, as did their comic personas. The real Kid 'n Play appeared in live-action wraparounds of the cartoons, but voice actors (again including close friend, Martin Lawrence) performed in the animated portions of the show. The show stressed positive role models, teaching kids how to get along and stay out of trouble.  A 1992 Marvel Comics comic book based on the cartoon lasted nine issues. They also shot some segments for the PBS math show Square One TV and Sesame Street.

Kid 'n Play were featured in the Adult Swim animated special Freaknik: The Musical as themselves. They also returned to the House Party series, appearing in House Party: Tonight's the Night in which they reprise their roles from the first three films. Since the events of the third film, the two have gone on to become music superstars and CEOs of their own record label- Kick Power Records (a venture they began in the third film).

After the duo 
Reid continued acting, guest starring in a number of television sitcoms, including Full House, Sister, Sister and Smart Guy and hosting shows such as It's Showtime at the Apollo and Your Big Break. Martin became a born-again Christian, and devoted his time to working on Christian-based hip-hop music projects. He eventually took his industry experience and founded HP4Digital Works, a multimedia company that provides pre- and post-production for film, digital, and live theater productions. He also founded Brand Newz, an online news magazine focusing on positive community leaders and events.  Martin joined the faculty at North Carolina Central University in Durham, North Carolina as an Artist in Resident where he teaches a credited course titled Hip Hop in Context 101.  Martin was also a judge for the 8th annual Independent Music Awards. The duo is currently on a tour of the House Party anniversary along with other rappers such as Salt-n-Pepa.

In 2009, State Farm released a commercial featuring LeBron James dancing to the music of Kid 'n Play. In October 2009, the duo appeared on the BET Hip Hop Awards where they did their trademark dance. On February 9, 2010, the duo appeared on The Mo'Nique Show. On June 23, 2010, the duo appeared on Lopez Tonight and performed "Rollin' with Kid 'n Play" from their album 2 Hype.

Reid made a cameo appearance at the end of the LMFAO video for "Sorry for Party Rocking", which recalled Kid n Play's House Party movies.

On February 27, 2012, Kid 'n Play released an "open letter," detailing planned future events. On July 30, 2012, Kid 'n Play joined Salt-N-Pepa onstage at a concert in Brooklyn, New York.

On July 23, 2013, the duo made a cameo appearance in the fifth House Party installment, House Party: Tonight's the Night.

On February 2, 2014, the duo made a cameo appearance in the RadioShack Super Bowl XLVIII commercial, "The '80s Called".

On July 15, 2015, Kid 'n Play were interviewed for an episode of TV One's Unsung.

On August 3, 2021, Kid 'n Play were announced to be on the Insane Clown Posse's 2021 Gathering of the Juggalos festival.

Discography

Studio albums

Soundtracks albums

Unreleased albums 
The Best of Kid N Play: A Sound Investment (2003)

Singles

As lead artist

B-sides

Promotional singles

Guest appearances

Videography

Video singles

Filmography 
 Kid 'n Play (1990, animated cartoon, NBC)
 The Earth Day Special (1990)
 House Party (1990)
 House Party 2 (1991)
 Class Act (1992)
 Bodyguards (TV Movie) (1993)
 House Party 3 (1994)
 House Party: Tonight's the Night (2013)
 House Party  (2023)

References

Notes

Citations

External links 

African-American musical groups
American musical duos
American comedy duos
Hip hop duos
Select Records artists
Musical groups established in 1987
Musical groups from New York City